KCRX may refer to:

 KCRX (AM), a radio station (1430 AM) licensed to Roswell, New Mexico, United States
 KCRX-FM, a radio station (102.3 FM) licensed to Seaside, Oregon, United States
 KCRX, ICAO airport code for Roscoe Turner Airport, Corinth Mississippi United States